The 2009 Liga de Voleibol Superior Femenino was the 41st official season of Liga de Voleibol Superior Femenino (English: Female Superior Volleyball League). The 2009 season was dedicated to Rosario Vega de Raíces.

Competing Teams

Regular season

Regular Season Awards

Individual awards 

 Most Valuable Player
 Jordan Larson Vaqueras de Bayamón
 Best Scorer
 Jordan Larson Vaqueras de Bayamón
 Best Scorer (Average)
 Jordan Larson Vaqueras de Bayamón
 Best Spiker
 Jordan Larson Vaqueras de Bayamón
 Best Spiker (Average)
 Jordan Larson Vaqueras de Bayamón
 Best Blocker
 Jessica Jones Caribes de San Sebastián
 Best Blocker (Average)
 Jessica Jones Caribes de San Sebastián
 Best Server
 Yasary Castrodad Gigantes de Carolina
 Best Server
 Shonda Cole Caribes de San Sebastián
 Best Server (Average)
 Yasary Castrodad Gigantes de Carolina
 Best Digger
 Deborah Seilhamer Indias de Mayagüez
 Best Digger (Average)
 Deborah Seilhamer Indias de Mayagüez

 Best Setter
 Vilmarie Mojica Pinkin de Corozal
 Best Setter (Average)
 Vilmarie Mojica Pinkin de Corozal
 Best Receiver
 Xaimara Colón Gigantes de Carolina
 Best Receiver (Average)
 Shara Venegas Llaneras de Toa Baja
 Best Libero
 Deborah Seilhamer Indias de Mayagüez
 Comeback Player of the Year
 Doris Torresola Valencianas de Juncos
 More Progress Player
 Yeimily Mojica Llaneras de Toa Baja
 Rookie of the Year
 Lorraine Avilés Leonas de Ponce
 Coach Of the Year
 Juan Carlos Núñez Llaneras de Toa Baja
 Chairman Of the Year
 Peter Rivera Vaqueras de Bayamón
 Chairman Of the Year
 Martín Rosado Llaneras de Toa Baja
 Referee of the Year
 Héctor Ortiz

2009 All-Stars Team

2009 Offensive Team

All Star Game

Results 
 Sunday March 15, 2009

Teams

Nativas (Natives) 
Head coach:  Juan Carlos Núñez

Importadas (Foreigners) 
Head coach:  Luis Enrique “Kike” Ruiz

All-Star Game Most Valuable Player 
  Jordan Larson Vaqueras de Bayamón

Quarter finals

Group A

Group B

Semifinals

Group A

Group B

Final

Best of 7 Series

Awards 
 Final Series Most Valuable Player
 Graciela Márquez Llaneras de Toa Baja

References

External links 
 League Website (Archived 2009-07-30)

PUR
LVSF2009
2009 in Puerto Rican sports